Cody Lange (born 24 October 1994) is an Australian netball player in the Suncorp Super Netball league, playing for the Adelaide Thunderbirds.

Lange began her career at the Thunderbirds in 2011 and played at the club for six of the next seven seasons, missing only the 2013 season. In 2017 Lange moved to new club the Collingwood Magpies and was a starting player until suffering an injury to her anterior cruciate ligament which forced her to miss the finals series. She was relegated to a training partner position at the Magpies the following season, though led the club's reserves team to their inaugural premiership in the Australian Netball League. At the end of the season Lange returned to the South Australia and was signed by the Thunderbirds.

References

External links
 Super Netball profile

1994 births
Australian netball players
Adelaide Thunderbirds players
Collingwood Magpies Netball players
Living people
Suncorp Super Netball players
Australian Netball League players
Southern Force (netball) players
Tasmanian Magpies players
Netball players from South Australia
Australian Institute of Sport netball players
People educated at Immanuel College, Adelaide
South Australian Sports Institute netball players